Rubio is a Spanish surname. Notable people with the surname include:
 Álvaro Rubio (born 1979), Spanish professional footballer
 Angel Rubio (born 1975), American footballer
 Antoni Rubió i Lluch (1856–1937), Spanish-Catalan historian
 Antonio Rubio (born 1949), Spanish boxer
 Chris Rubio, American football trainer
 David Rubio (1934–2000), English instrument maker
 Diego Morcillo Rubio de Auñón (1642–1730), Spanish bishop
 Eduardo Rubio (born 1983), Chilean footballer
 Eurípides Rubio (1938–1966), American officer
 Fanny Rubio (born 1949), Spanish academic
 Francisco Rubio (born 1953), French footballer
 Francisco Rubio (astronaut) (born 1975), American astronaut
 Francisco Rubio Llorente (1930–2016), Spanish jurist
 Gonzalo Rubio Orbe (1909–1994), Ecuadorian scholar
 Gwyn Hyman Rubio (born 1949), American author
 Hugo Eduardo Rubio (born 1960), Chilean footballer
 Ingrid Rubio (born 1975), Spanish actress
 Israel José Rubio (born 1981), Venezuelan weightlifter
 Javier Gómez Cifuentes Rubio (born 1981), Spanish footballer
 Jeanette Dousdebes Rubio, wife of Marco Rubio
 Jesús González Rubio (died 1874), Mexican music professor
 Joan Rubió (1870–1952), Spanish architect
 Joaquín Rubio y Muñoz (1788–1874), Spanish lawyer
 Jorge Rubio (baseball) (1945–2020), Mexican baseball player
 Jorge Rubio (boxing trainer), Cuban boxing trainer
 José González Rubio (1804–1875), Spanish-American friar
 José López Rubio (1903–1996), Spanish filmmaker
 José María Rubio (1864–1929), Spanish Jesuit
 Juan José León Rubio, Mexican politician
 Kevin Rubio (born 1967), American filmmaker
 Luigi Rubio (died 1882), Italian painter
 Lydia Rubio Ferrer (born 1946), Cuban artist
 Marco Antonio Rubio (born 1980), Mexican boxer
 Marco Rubio (born 1971), American politician
 Mariano Rubio (1931–1999), Spanish economist
 Mario Martínez Rubio (born 1985), Spanish footballer
 Mariano Navarro Rubio (1913–2001), Spanish politician
 Matías Rubio (born 1988), Chilean footballer
 Michael Rubio (born 1977), American politician
 Miguel Ángel Rubio Buedo (born 1961), Spanish footballer
 Óscar Rubio Fauria (born 1984), Spanish footballer
 Óscar Rubio Ramos (born 1976), Spanish footballer
 Pascual Ortiz Rubio (1877–1963), Mexican politician
 Paulina Rubio (born 1971), Mexican singer
 Pilar Rubio (born 1978), Spanish TV presenter
 Ricky Rubio (born 1990), Spanish basketball player
 Simón de Roxas Clemente y Rubio (1777–1827), Spanish botanist

See also
 Rubio (disambiguation)

Spanish-language surnames